Hard Candy: A Book of Stories is a collection of short stories by American writer Tennessee Williams, which was first published in 1954 by New Directions.

The nine stories are "Three Players of a Summer Game," "Two on a Party," "The Resemblance between a Violin Case and a Coffin," "Hard Candy", "Rubio y Morena," "The Mattress by the Tomato Patch," "The Coming of Something to the Widow Holly," "The Vine," and "The Mysteries of the Joy Rio."

In March 1954 Williams noted in a letter that he was "pulling together a short-long play based on the characters in "Three Players." The play was Cat on a Hot Tin Roof.

The 1967 paperback edition, dedicated to Jane and Paul Bowles, notes that "Hard Candy" is a later version of "The Mysteries of the Joy Rio," yet both stories are included, despite employing the same theme and the same setting, because the accounts are so different.

References

1954 short story collections
Short story collections by Tennessee Williams
New Directions Publishing books